Jacques-David Embé (born November 13, 1973) is a Cameroonian former soccer player who played as striker.

He played in various countries throughout his career, including for Belenenses of Portugal, Larissa of Greece, Tecos UAG of Mexico, Shanghai Shenhua of China, Deportivo Municipal of Peru,Chernomorets Novorossiysk of Russia and New England Revolution of the United States.

He  played for the Cameroon national football team from 1993 to 1997. Embé also played in the 1994 FIFA World Cup in the United States and scored in their Group B game against Sweden at the Rose Bowl in Pasadena, California in front of over 93,000 fans.

External links 
Official Web-Site

1973 births
Living people
Footballers from Yaoundé
Cameroonian footballers
Cameroonian expatriate footballers
Cameroon under-20 international footballers
Cameroon international footballers
1994 FIFA World Cup players
Athlitiki Enosi Larissa F.C. players
Super League Greece players
Expatriate footballers in China
Expatriate footballers in Greece
Expatriate footballers in Mexico
Expatriate footballers in Peru
Expatriate footballers in Portugal
Expatriate footballers in Russia
Shanghai Shenhua F.C. players
Deportivo Municipal footballers
FC Chernomorets Novorossiysk players
Russian Premier League players
Tecos F.C. footballers
Liga MX players
C.F. Os Belenenses players
Primeira Liga players
Cameroonian expatriate sportspeople in China
Cameroonian expatriate sportspeople in Greece
Cameroonian expatriate sportspeople in Mexico
Cameroonian expatriate sportspeople in Portugal
Cameroonian expatriate sportspeople in Russia
Association football forwards